Camélia Sahnoune (born 5 April 1986) is an Algerian triple jumper.

She finished fourth at the 2008 African Championships. Her personal best jump is 13.92 metres, achieved in May 2008 in Algiers.

References

1986 births
Living people
Algerian female triple jumpers
Place of birth missing (living people)
21st-century Algerian people